Godolphin Crown, registered as the Hawkesbury Crown, is a Hawkesbury Racing Club Group 3 Thoroughbred horse race for fillies and mares three years old and older, with set weights with penalties conditions, over a distance of 1300 metres, held at Hawkesbury Racecourse in Clarendon, New South Wales, Australia.  Total prize money for the race is A$175,000.

History

Grade
 2011–2013 - Listed Race
 2014 onwards - Group 3

Venue
 2015 - Rosehill Racecourse
 2020 - Rosehill Racecourse

Name
 2011–2015 - The Darley Crown
 2016 - Godolphin Crown

Winners

 2022 - Exotic Ruby
 2021 - Sweet Deal
 2020 - Sweet Scandal
 2019 - Irithea 
 2018 - Pecans 
 2017 - Shillelagh 
 2016 - Nancy  
 2015 - ‡Solicit
 2014 - Aerobatics
 2013 - Aerobatics
 2012 - More Strawberries   
 2011 - Kanzan   
 2010 - Serenissima

‡ Race meeting abandoned after the first race on the card due to prolonged rain that affected the state of the track  Race held the following week at Rosehill Racecourse.

See also
 List of Australian Group races
 Group races

References

Horse races in Australia
Sprint category horse races for fillies and mares